Hyponerita brueckneri is a moth of the subfamily Arctiinae. It was described by Max Gaede in 1928. It is found in Guatemala.

References

 

Phaegopterina
Moths described in 1928